Kënga Magjike 07 was the seventh edition of the Albanian music contest Kënga Magjike and 
took place in the Palace of Congresses in Tirana. There were two semi-finals (11 & 12 November 2005) and a final (13 November 2005). 31 songs competed for the win but only 14 made it to the final. In the end, Gentiana Ismajli won the first prize. Grupi Aurora was the runner-up. The winner was determined by the singers who voted for each other.

Results

Non-finalists

Voting procedure 

The singers voted for each other to determine the ranking of the songs.

Jury decided the following prizes:

 Çmimi I Kritikës (Critic's Prize)
 Interpretimi Më I Mirë (Best Interpretation)
 Çesk Zadeja (Çesk Zadeja)
 Magjia E Parë (First Magic)

Televote decided the following prizes:

 Kënga Hit (Hit Song)
 Çmimi I Internetit (Internet Prize)
 Çmimi I Publikut (Public's Prize)

Jury 

 President Of The Jury: Robert Radoja
 Florin Klemendi
 Opera Singer: Edit Mihali
 Songwriter: Zhuliana Jorganxhi
 Singer: Zana Çela
 Enkel Demi
 Singer: Irma Libohova
 Singer, Composer, Songwriter: Pirro Çako
 Songwriter: Floran Kondi (Dr. Flori)

Other prizes

Orchestra 

Playback was used.

Guest artists 

 Yllka Mujo

Politicians 

 Majlinda Bregu
 Monika Kryemadhi

Sang a version of Ardit Gjebrea's song "Dimëroj".

Others 

 Refik Halili

Donated a car to jury president Robert Radoja.

Staff 

 Organizer: Ardit Gjebrea
 Directors: Agron Vulaj & Astrit Idrizi

Sources 

 KM Official Website: http://www.kengamagjike.com
 Related info: Revista Albaniac
 Download all Songs: Shkarko Kenga Magjike 2007 ne Mp3 Falas

2005
2005 in Albania